Punta Ala (formerly Punta Troia) is a frazione of the town of Castiglione della Pescaia, in the province of Grosseto, Tuscany, Italy. The small town with a population of 402 people lies at the bottom of the northern hillsides of the promontory of the same name. The coastal town is a popular summer seaside destination.

History
Previously known as Punta Troia, changed its name to Punta Ala (from aviation jargon, Ala means wing in Italian) after the Italian aviator Italo Balbo, who had purchased some fortifications and villas in the area which later became his residences. Punta Ala literally translates to "point wing", describing the whole area as a wing of a plane with Punta Ala situated in the very tip of it.

The modern day tourist center developed during the course of the twentieth century, particularly in the 1970s.

The town is famous for its sailing regattas which are held by the local Yacht Club Punta Ala and the well equipped tourist port, the home of Luna Rossa.

While Punta Ala becomes a popular family destination during the summer, the place is a tourist destination of the elite in every season, thanks to its luxury residences, second homes and boats moored at the local port.

Monuments
While presenting itself as a modern, functional and exclusive beach resort, Punta Ala was situated in a vital strategical position on the border between the Principality of Piombino in the north and the Grand Duchy of Tuscany to the south.

The fear of pirate invasions forced the construction of some fortifications to protect the coast.

The Hidalgo Tower, overlooking the modern town, was built during the sixteenth century to defend the far end of the southern principality of Piombino.

Il Castello di Punta Ala (Punta Ala castle), was also built in the sixteenth century by the Medici on the headland to the south-east of the site for the control of the north coast of Castiglione della Pescaia.

The Appiani Tower was built by its name sake to further enhance the defense system of the principality.

Image gallery

See also 
 Buriano, Castiglione della Pescaia
 Pian d'Alma
 Pian di Rocca
 Roccamare
 Rocchette
 Tirli
 Vetulonia

References

External links
 Portale PuntaAla.net
 Associazione Tutela di Punta Ala
 Parrocchia della Consolata di Punta Ala

Frazioni of Castiglione della Pescaia
Coastal towns in Tuscany